The Ninigret National Wildlife Refuge is a National Wildlife Refuge situated along the shore of Ninigret Pond. It is characterized by salt marshes, kettle ponds, freshwater wetlands, maritime shrub lands, and forests, and it is seasonally inhabited by over 250 species of birds. The area was originally used for farming, prior to being utilized in World War II as a Naval Auxiliary landing field. During the winter months, black ducks, Canada geese, and diving ducks are especially prominent on the pond, while various species of migrating raptors are also common. Wildlife refuge staff also maintain a piping plover nesting program.

The refuge encompasses land of the former Naval Auxiliary Air Station Charlestown.

References

Protected areas of Washington County, Rhode Island
National Wildlife Refuges in Rhode Island
Charlestown, Rhode Island
Nature centers in Rhode Island
Wetlands of Rhode Island
Landforms of Washington County, Rhode Island
Protected areas established in 1970
1970 establishments in Rhode Island